Sawyer is a ghost town in Fillmore County, Nebraska, United States.

History
Sawyer was laid out in 1887. A post office was established at Sawyer in 1888, and remained in operation until it was discontinued in 1921. The town was named for Simeon Sawyer, a pioneer settler.

References

Geography of Fillmore County, Nebraska